Road to Rouen is the fifth studio album by English rock band Supergrass. The album was released in the UK on 15 August 2005 by Parlophone, and in the US on 27 September 2005 by Capitol Records. The title refers to the city in northern France where the album was recorded, as well as the 1978 album Road to Ruin by punk rock band Ramones.

Road to Rouen was a difficult album for the band due to personal reasons, including Danny Goffey's tabloid ordeal and the death of Gaz and Rob Coombes' mother. The album reflected a rough period for the band and was oriented towards longer, looser, more orchestral material. The record was highly acclaimed and well received by most fans of the band; it reached a respectable number 9 on the UK Albums Chart. Three singles were released from the album: "St. Petersburg" in August 2005, which peaked on the UK Singles Chart at number 22; "Low C" in October 2005, which peaked at number 52; and "Fin" in January 2006, which failed to enter the Top 100.

Recording
In 2004, the band opted to move away from Sawmills Studio in Cornwall, where their first three albums had been recorded, and settled at Studio St. Mard, a converted barn in Rouen, Normandy. Supergrass claimed to have been more "focused" despite the rural surroundings and rudimentary recording equipment. Aside from their traditional instrumentation, the band used zithers, ukuleles, brass, strings, and a drum machine. The album's first single, "St. Petersburg", was recorded in one take and features no overdubs. Drummer Danny Goffey said of the album's more acoustic, streamlined recording: "It was a kind of conscious decision to make an album that didn't have a three-minute single, something that had more of a mellow vibe about it. There have been those obscure tracks that have been on the albums that no one probably had heard, because people just buy our singles or see just what's on the charts or on the radio. So yeah, we wanted to make sure that that side of us come out of us a bit more, you know, and that we didn't just pick some radio friendly song to release."

In a 2008 interview, bassist Mick Quinn said the introspection and orchestration of the album was "almost entirely" a direct reaction to the death of the Coombes brothers' mother, as well as Danny Goffey's tabloid ordeal. "Some of it was a reaction to other bad stuff that was going on," said Quinn. "I don't think anyone was in the mood to release another set of "Alright"-style jovial pop songs. Everyone was in a very stern frame of mind. Danny had a lot of personal stuff going on, thanks to the adult tabloid media. He was really messed up. You have to make the most of a bad situation though, and you try and express yourself through your music. It would have been a lie to try and do 'up' music at that point. The lyrics probably were commercial suicide though – it didn't sell particularly well... but I'm more proud that it actually exists than if it didn't."

Artwork 
The front cover photo depicts a cattle bridge near Lefaux, France, that crosses the A16 autoroute, part of the route between Boulogne and Rouen. It was taken at dusk using a Canon EOS 350D set to a 10-second exposure as a lorry passed under the bridge. (the photography is credited to Mick Quinn and Paul Wilson). The inner photo was taken by Pierre Olivier Margerand (studio engineer) and shows the keyboard and drum set up in the live room of Studio St. Mard. Overall album design was by graphic company Traffic and Mick Quinn.

Critical reception

Road to Rouen was released to generally favourable reviews. At Metacritic, which assigns a normalised rating out of 100 based on reviews from mainstream critics, the album has received a score of 73, based on 22 reviews. Stephen Thomas Erlewine of AllMusic awarded the album 4.5 out of 5 stars, and said of the album, "...there's a mastery of tone, as the group creates a warm, trippy, late-night vibe and then never lets it flag over the course of nine songs." Erlewine then hailed the album as "a terrific little record" and concluded, "Supergrass have found new things to do with their sound without getting self-consciously mature or middlebrow." John Murphy of MusicOMH lavished the album with praise, stating that Road to Rouen "adds up to the sound of a band developing and maturing nicely, without ever losing sight of what made them so great in the first place." By contrast, Jack Smith of the BBC was more critical of the album, concluding that, "Supergrass have outlasted most of their contemporaries and still have it in them to make a truly amazing masterpiece. Unfortunately Road to Rouen is not quite it."

Track listing

Personnel
 Gaz Coombes – vocals, guitar
 Mick Quinn – bass, vocals
 Danny Goffey – drums
 Robert Coombes – keyboards
 Written and produced by Supergrass
 Engineered by Pierre Olivier Margerand
 Mixed by Michael Ilbert, except:
 Tracks 1 and 4 mixed by Michael Ilbert and Supergrass
 Track 5 mixed by Pierre Olivier Margerand
 Strings and horns arranged by Simon Hale and Supergrass
 Conducted by Simon Hale
 Backing singers on "Low C": Andy Lovegrove, Laura Capillaire, and Jules Francis
 Arranged and recorded by Andy Lovegrove
 Photography by P. Wilson, M. Quinn, and P.O.M.

Charts

Release history

References

External links

Road to Rouen at YouTube (streamed copy where licensed)
Road to Rouen – official album site

Supergrass albums
2005 albums
Parlophone albums
Rouen